Dave Halili is a contemporary American fine arts illustrator, graffiti writer and graphic designer of album cover paintings, posters, logos, T-shirts along with other forms of representational merchandise. His best-known works are album covers for Body Count (Body Count, Born Dead), Ice-T (Home Invasion, VI - Return of the Real), The Skeletones (Skeletones Red) and Moon Ska Records compilation California Ska-Quake. An array of collaborations in the Hollywood entertainment industry and indie music scene have garnered him a Diamond record plaque, three Platinum awards, three Gold records and two Gold Europe plaques certified and registered by the RIAA.

Career
Halili has also worked with N.W.A, No Doubt, Gwen Stefani, Kurtis Blow, Donald D, King Tee, Stone Temple Pilots, Everlast, Monie Love, Ednaswap, Fishbone /Angelo Moore, Autolux, Carla Azar, Gripsta, Keith Sweat, Afrika Islam, DJ Evil E , Prince Whipper Whip, Grandmaster Caz, D-Roc the Executioner, Tim Story & T.D.F., Hijack, Lord Finesse, Dance Hall Crashers, The Toasters, Royal Crown Revue, Hepcat, Let's Go Bowling, Robert "Bucket" Hingley , Reel Big Fish, DJ Yutaka, DJ Honda and Zebrahead.

Body Count album cover
Halili's artwork on the cover of Body Count came to symbolize the band's song "Cop Killer", which was widely criticized by the authorities, and raised questions about the boundaries between artistic freedom and censorship. This controversy, together with an executive clash over Halili's proposed montage for the jacket of Home Invasion, forced Ice-T to leave Warner Bros. Records. On March 23, 1993, Ice-T released the album with Halili's original illustration, produced by his own record label  Records.

Personal life
Halili resides and works in Orange County, California, where he runs a studio and screen printing workshop named Halili-Style Graphics & More.

Halili is also a lifetime member of the Universal Zulu Nation and the original Los Angeles-based . A friendship between Halili and TV producer Michael G. Moye led to a fortuitous business co-op where Halili designed and manufactured media publicity products for Fox's first prime-time T.V. sitcom Married... with Children.

References

External links
Smithsonian National Museum of American History
Norman Rockwell Museum
Artist Discogs Profile

American illustrators
Album-cover and concert-poster artists
Painters from California
American graffiti artists
American graphic designers
20th-century American painters
American male painters
American artists of Japanese descent
Japanese graphic designers
American artists of Filipino descent
Filipino painters
American contemporary painters
American printers
American people of German descent
American people of Chinese descent
Ice-T
Body Count (band)
People from Fullerton, California
Living people
1968 births